Porta Venezia is an underground station on Line 1 of the Milan Metro. It was opened on 1 November 1964 as part of the inaugural section of the Metro, between Sesto Marelli and Lotto.

The station is located at Porta Venezia, in Corso Buenos Aires, near the Milan Natural History Museum.

The station offers an interchange with the Milan S Lines at Milano Porta Venezia station.

Since June 2018, the walls of the station have been decorated in the colors of the LGBT flag in support of gay pride, thanks to funding from sponsor Netflix. The intervention was supposed to be temporary, but, in August 2018, at the request of mayor Beppe Sala, ATM announced that the station will remain permanently decorated with the rainbow colors.

References

External links

Line 1 (Milan Metro) stations
Railway stations opened in 1964
1964 establishments in Italy
Railway stations in Italy opened in the 20th century